London Buses route 45 is a Transport for London contracted bus route in London, England. Running between Clapham Park and Elephant & Castle, it is operated by Abellio London.

History

Route 45 was introduced on 1 October 1950 as a replacement for trolleybus route 34 between Battersea and Farringdon Street via Clapham Junction, Clapham Common, Stockwell, Brixton, Camberwell Green, Elephant & Castle and Blackfriars Bridge. It was operated by AEC Routemasters. On 17 January 1951 it was extended from Battersea to South Kensington station. On 1 February 1961, the route was extended from Farringdon Street to Hampstead Heath via Grays Inn Road and King's Cross replacing trolleybus route 513. On 8 January 1972, it was withdrawn between King's Cross and Hampstead and replaced by route 46. On 28 October 1978, the route was extended from King's Cross to Archway station.

On 3 August 1985, route 45 was converted to one man operation with the AEC Routemasters replaced by Leyland Titans.

Having been operated by London Central out of Camberwell garage since first tendered in 1987, on 11 November 2017 it was taken over by Abellio London's Walworth garage with Alexander Dennis Enviro400 MMCs introduced. On 15 June 2019, the route was withdrawn between King's Cross and Elephant & Castle.

In June 2022 Transport for London launched a consultation with a view to withdrawing route 45, with route 35 and a re-routed 59 continuing to serve its length. However, it decided not to go ahead with the proposals and so no changes to route 45 were made.

Current route
Route 45 operates via these primary locations: 
Clapham Park
Brixton station  
Loughborough Junction station 
Camberwell Green
Elephant & Castle station 
Elephant & Castle

References

External links

Bus routes in London
Transport in the London Borough of Camden
Transport in the London Borough of Lambeth
Transport in the London Borough of Southwark
Transport in the City of London